Ezhumanthuruthu (എഴുമാന്തുരുത്ത്) is a small "thuruthu" i.e. island situated 8 km west of Kaduthuruthy town.  It falls in the Kottayam district of India, the city of letters.  It is a densely populated place of Kaduthuruthy Gram Panchayat.

The population is around 3,500, in an area about two square kilometers.  It is a twin "thuruthu" comprising the main land Ezhumanthuruthu and another small thuruthu called Pulithuruthu.  The adjoining place to the east is the famous Ayamkudy and to the west is the popular water-logged place of upper Kuttanad known as "Mundar estate".  The populace of Ezhumanthuruthu is 90% agriculture labourers and small or medium farmers.

One can reach Ezhumanthuruthu straight from nearby town Thalayolaparambu by road of 5 km or from Kaduthuruthy town.  The nearest railway station is Kaduthuruthy railway station.  It is about 6 km away from this place.  Long ago, the place was surrounded by rivers.  Now any one can access through road.

Mythology
Ezhumanthuruthu has a well-known history of its origin.  During the 18-19th century due to Tipu Sultan's invasion of Malabar area, Brahmins of Palaghat and their soldiers eloped towards south.  On their route, some families settled at this small place.  One of the Namboothiripad was believed to have divine powers.  He used to bathe early morning in nearby river.  One day a mango tree fell down on his route causing obstacle to his way.  He murmured three times "Ezhumave".

"Ezhu" means stand up and "mave" means mango tree in Malayalam.  After this incident the mango tree stood up and cleared the way for the Namboothiripad.  Thereafter, the place was known as Ezhumanthuruthu and the house of the Namboothiripad as Ezhumavil Mana. Correct meaning of "Ezhu" is seven, hence Ezhumanthuruthu means island of seven mango trees. The former one is someone's belief only. In legend it was said that the Pandavas travelled through this place during their twelve years' "ajnathavasam".  There said to be lies a stone bridge beneath the north side Kariyar river which they constructed for crossing the river.

The architects of Ezhumanthuruthu
The present day developments, enjoyed by the people of this place is the result of hard work of Sri. Godan Namboodiripad, popularly known as Godan thirumeni.  He contributed land to build up the only one upper primary school. When all the LP Schools lost 5th standard, Ezhumanthuruthu LPS retained it because of this Thirumeni.  His efforts were immense to develop the school.  Due to his hard work and timely intervention, a public telephone booth was commissioned after dragging the over head line of 4 km line which was very difficult to get sanction from the authorities during that period.   A post box was also brought into Ezhumanthuruthu and hang on the wall of the then LP School in 1960s.  He was instrumental for the progress of this small island.  He died on 2 January 2007 at his elder son Babu's residence at Ahmedabad.  He was 85 years.

Public places
There is a U.P. School.A Branch of co-operative Bank,  A co-operative milk society, a Public Library known as Netaji Smaraka Gramina Grandhasala and a post office (B.O).

Government U.P. School
This school is established in 1918(?)Education department record shows that the school was officially affiliated in 1921 by Mr.Baker, a British national to provide basic and elementary education to the village folk. There was no connectivity with other places. The land was surrounded with water hence small kids can't go for their schooling. In the beginning of the 20th century, the place was surrounded by Kariyar, Kalathode and Mathankari river. This place was an island (thuruthu in Malayalam), hence an isolated place; travelling to other places was very difficult. Primary and basic education was not accessible to the poor downtrodden folk. Untouchability was prevailing those days. There was a foreign landlord (Mr. Baker) lived in the place looking after the now turned "surplus land" (michabhoomi) alias "sayippin kari". He built a single shed school for providing primary education. After independence from the Travancore Rajas and British Raj, The school had been taken over by the government of Kerala and classes were run up to 5th standard in a newly constructed building near to the old building. The land had been donated by a generous man popularly known as Parackal Pappu. He died in 1998. Thereafter in the 1970s there was a popular demand to upgrade the school to Upper primary i.e. up to 7th standard, again shortage of land was an issue. Sri. Godan Namboothirippad donated some land and the upgradation committee of the school purchased the rest to fulfill the need. 
In the "People's Plan" project, a new block has been built. The school celebrated its 90th anniversary.Now it is planning for celebrating the century colourfully. Many former students of this school had been reached great heights in their life. Now a forum has been constituted for its 100th anniversary.It is an appeal to all Ezhumanthuruthu residents, living locally and abroad, to come forward to dignify their role in the ceremony. To communicate with the forum an e-mail id has been created. It is also available in the social media, Facebook, (Ezhumanthuruthu Ups). An adhoc committee has been formed under the chairman ship of Mr.Thankamai, the retired headmaster of the school. The history of Ezhumanthuruthu is very interesting for the new generation to know how their forefathers had lived there, struggled there for survival. The book is under preparation.
The shathabdi(centenary) celebration is planned for a year long event to link people of every walks of life.

On 27 March 2016, a committee has been formed for the development of the school named as "Govt.UP School Development committee" under the patronage of Kaduthuruthy MLA, shri Mons Joseph and President of kaduthuruthy Grama Panchayath. The working committee chairperson is Ward member Mrs. Shyla Aravind, Convenor Dr. Pushpan and Treasurer school Headmaster Mr. Suvarnan T.K. 25 member committee has been formed and more intellectuals and well wishers staying abroad will be nominated.

In the initial sitting the committee has taken decision to start LKG and UKG and English medium classes.

About the library
This library is organised and coordinated by a group of youngsters in the 1990s who arranged benefit shows, collected books and received donations for buying books.  Several distinguished people give out their contribution. The library got registration in the state library council. It is now one of the assets for the young generations. Thousands of books are there in the stack. Those who are interested to contribute the development of this library are highly solicited. The name has been given as a memorial of the living legend Netaji Subash Chandra Bose.

Places of worship
There are some places of worship.  The Kunnumel Kavu devi temple is situated on top of a small hill.  The deity is a devi and lots of people from neighbouring places visit every day.  This is managed by local SNDP branch.  It is often believed that this devi roams in the night hours to see her devotees and to enquire about their well-beings.
There was a history in last century that during the tragic flood, people seek asylum on top of the hill because all other surrounding areas were inundated by water. It was a nice scenery from top of the hill to watch the Mundar estate towards Vaikom.

Another temple is known as Poonkavil Sri. Balabdra devi.  The deity is goddess Baala Bhadra.  It is a popular belief among the village folk that devi Baalabhadra looks after the well being of every girl child.  Also worshiping and offering the famous Neyyvilakku and Lemon chain by adolescent girls speeds up their wedlock.

Another place of worship is the Chelakkapally ammavan.  He was a strong warrior of the then Rajhas,fought and martyr.  Due to his martyrdom people worship in this temple.

Another famous temple is the thrikayil temple.  The lord Siva and Ayyappa are the deities and lots of people visits this temple every day.  It is managed by the NSS Karayogam. 
Another temple is Vallickeril Gandharva Kshetram.
Another place of worship is the Muthappan kavu.

In the yard of Ezhumavil Mana, there is another deity named "Sankaranarayanan".  This was actually installed in the Nadumittam of this mana.  After some time this mana was reconstructed and the deity was left in the yard.  The deity is popularly known as "Mittathu thevar" meaning "god in the yard".  Years before, one day a "bright light appeared in the Nalukett.  At that time no namboodiries were there.  There were only antharjanams (ladies of nambudiri family).  They found this light quiet unusual and installed in the nalukettu only."

Inland water tourism
Ezhumanthuruthu is emerging as a hub for the "Monsoon tourism" and "Inland water tourism".  Several foreigners used to visit the nearby place "Mundar estate" which has a unique feature that during heavy monsoon and subsequent flood, it is a marvelous experience for people to have a ride on the inundated area.  This place is otherwise called as a part of the "Upper Kuttanad". During paddy harvesting season it is a nice experience to visitors to watch the village folk engaged in harvesting rice.  The Koithupattu, traditional folk song sung by elders is now near extinction.  The villagers have a craze on performing boat race during Onam season as a mark of enthusiasm on the arrival of fresh rice, welcome for Onathappan and so on.  Spending a vacation on July- August in Ezhumanthuruthu is a memorable experience.

Ezhumanthuruthu is emerging as a tourist hub of Kaduthuruthy Grama Panchayath. Govt. of Kerala has a project to deepen the river extending towards vaikom to attract the foreign tourists. House boats and home stay arrangements are now available.

The adjacent place "Mundar" is a very special geographic area.

Model Tourism Village

Ezhumanthuruthu has been declared "Model Tourism Village" of Kaduthuruthy Grama Panchayath by Responsible Tourism (RT) Mission of Govt. of Kerala and is included in World tourism map.

Islands of Kerala
Islands of India
Populated places in India